Echols may refer to:

Echols (surname)
Echols County, Georgia, a county in Georgia
Echols, Kentucky, a community
Echols, Minnesota, a community